Mike Busch (born February 8, 1962) is a retired professional American football player who played quarterback for the New York Giants.

Busch played NCAA Division IAA College Football for Idaho State he was a member of the 1981 IAA National Championship football team before transferring to South Dakota State to finish his career. In 1984 he had a school-record 2,426 passing yards for the Jackrabbits, including a school-record 379 yards on September 15 against Morningside. The next season, he broke his own record with 2,554 passing yards, upset undefeated #1 USD, led the Jackrabbits to a 7-2 record for first place in the division, and was named MVP of the North Central Conference.

He was signed as an undrafted free agent by the Atlanta Falcons in 1986 and released. In 1987, he was signed by the New York Giants where he appeared in his only two professional games. In Week 3, he relieved Jim Crocicchia in the late third quarter, completing three of his six passes for two touchdowns and an interception in a lopsided loss to the San Francisco 49ers. He started the next week against Washington in his only other professional appearance, completing 14 of 41 passes for 183 yards, a touchdown, an interceptions, and six sacks.  His 41 pass attempts and six sacks remain Giants rookie franchise records.

He is currently a middle school-high school principal and coach at Standing Rock Community School  School in [[Ft. Yates,North Dakota].

References

1962 births
American football quarterbacks
Atlanta Falcons players
New York Giants players
Idaho State Bengals football players
Living people
People from Lincoln County, South Dakota
People from Huron, South Dakota
South Dakota State Jackrabbits football players
Players of American football from South Dakota
National Football League replacement players